Noite Vazia, literally meaning Empty Night but translated as Men and Women, is a 1964 Brazilian drama film, one of the best known of the filmmaker Walter Hugo Khouri, with a soundtrack by Rogério Duprat executed by Zimbo Trio.

In November 2015 the film entered the list made by the Brazilian Association of Film Critics (Abraccine) of the 100 best Brazilian films of all time. It was entered into the 1965 Cannes Film Festival.

Plot
In São Paulo, two friends (one married and from a wealthy family) take two prostitutes for a night of searching for different pleasures. The experience turns out to be frustrating for all concerned, with the four spending the time talking about themselves, the bitterness of life and the emptiness of their lives.

Cast
 Norma Bengell as Mara
 Odete Lara as Regina
 Mário Benvenutti as Luisinho
 Gabriele Tinti as Nelson
 Lisa Negri as Nelson's lover
 Marisa Woodward
 Anita Kennedy
 Ricardo Rivas
 Célia Watanabe as Japanese waitress
 Wilfred Khouri as Luis's son

References

External links

1964 films
1964 drama films
1960s Portuguese-language films
Brazilian drama films
Brazilian black-and-white films
Films set in São Paulo
Films directed by Walter Hugo Khouri